The Battle Creek Flight are a team in the Independent Basketball Association (IBA) located in Battle Creek, Michigan.  They previously played in the Premier Basketball League (PBL) and in the International Basketball League. The team was known as the Battle Creek Knights prior to the 2013–14 season.

2005 season

The Knights lived up to their nickname of "The IBL's Power Team", by beating opponents by an average of 128–114. The Knights were led in scoring by Mike Williams, at 22.4 ppg. The Knights were undefeated in the regular season, and won the championship game, beating the Dayton Jets 124–121, for a final record of 21–0.

In addition to being the IBL's power team on the court, the Knights also led the league in attendance. Playing at Kellogg Arena, crowds of 2,500+ were not uncommon, and the team drew 1,854 to the championship and All-Star game, which they hosted. Three Knights made the all-star team; Bobby Madison, Jamal Gooding, and Mike Williams.

2006 season
The 2006 Knights were a victim of the IBL's expansion. The team finished 11–10, respectable, yet a far cry from being undefeated. The team lost their only playoff game 144–139 to the Holland Blast, an expansion team. Again, three all-stars were named, Logan Vander Velden, Mike Williams, and Jay Youngblood. Youngblood was also in the top 25 scorers, averaging 22.0 ppg (he also played part of the season with the Cuyahoga Falls Cougars. After the season, coach Williams resigned and was replaced by former Knight Logan Vander Velden.

2007 season
With Vander Velden at the helm, the Knights began to regain their winning ways, and locked into the 5th seed for the IBL playoffs, where they were eliminated by the defending champion Elkhart Express in the East final.

2008 season

The Knights started off with a 1–4 record, but rebounded to eventually end the regular season with a record of 9–11. The Knights opened the playoffs with a win against the Elgin Racers 116–100, only to fall to the Elkhart Express in the Eastern Conference finals 130–147.

During the off season, the Knights announced a switch to the winter playing Premier Basketball League (PBL).

2009 season
In their first year in the PBL, the Knights reeled off 12 straight wins before falling on the road to the Wilmington Sea Dawgs. They would lose only one other game and finish with a regular season record of 18–2, taking first place in the PBL's Central Division.  However, after controversy in the PBL championship series against the Rochester Razorsharks, the Knights left the PBL, first announcing they were taking a year off, but later changing that to playing in the IBL for 2010.

Current roster

Head Coach: Terry Sare

2009 season schedule

Season results

2005 – IBL Champions

All-Stars

2005
 Jamel Gooding
 Bobby Madison
 Mike Williams

2006
 Jamel Gooding
 Logan Vander Velden
 Jay Youngblood

2007
 Isaac Jefferson
 Nick Zachery

2008
 Bobby Madison

References

External links
Battle Creek Flight profile at USbasket

Independent Basketball Association teams
Former Premier Basketball League teams
Sports in Battle Creek, Michigan
Basketball teams in Michigan
Basketball teams established in 2004
2004 establishments in Michigan